Roseus is a Latin adjective meaning rose, rosy or pink.

Species and cultivars
 Roseus, a rosemary cultivar
 Roseus or Pink Snow, an early crocus (Crocus tommasinianus) cultivar

See also
 Rosea (disambiguation)
 Roseum (disambiguation)
 A. roseus (disambiguation)
 C. roseus (disambiguation)
 E. roseus (disambiguation)
 H. roseus (disambiguation)
 M. roseus (disambiguation)
 O. roseus (disambiguation)
 P. roseus (disambiguation)